Mission Backup Earth is a science fiction web series written and directed by Alexander Pfander. This award-winning series began airing in 2014, in a series of 5 to 15 minute YouTube episodes.

Mission Backup Earth uses modern scientific methods and concepts, and integrates them into a story, intending to give a realistic view of space travel and colonization, while questioning and exploring the evolution of mankind, cosmic disasters, and philosophical questions about humanity's existence.

Actor David Prowse, who played Darth Vader in the Star Wars films, has made a cameo in the show.

Actress Monika Gossmann, who was Designer #1 of the movie Iron Sky is a regular actress in the show as Dr Weir.

Actor Anthony Straeger is known for his role in the movie Land of Mine for the role of Officer Garth.

Awards 
2014 LAWebfest: Outstanding Directing, Visual Effects, Editing & Cinematography in a Sci-Fi series.

Media

Mission Backup Earth has been the subject of several articles published by online and print media organisations, mainly with a Science fiction focus, including Science Fiction and Fantasy Association of New Zealand, SF Crowsnest, Starburst (magazine) and Contactmusic.com

See also

List of Web television series

References

External links
 
 

2014 web series debuts
Science fiction web series
2010s YouTube series